Scouting in Manitoba has a long history, from the 1900s to the present day, serving thousands of youth in programs that suit the environment in which they live.

Scouts Canada

Manitoba is administered by the Manitoba Council of Scouts Canada.

Service Areas

Manitoba is divided into Service Areas, each with an Area Commissioner and (ideally) with a service team.

The current Service Areas are:
 Lakeland
 West Manitoba (West Man)
 Northern Manitoba (Nor Man)
 Pembina Trails
 North West Winnipeg
 Agassiz Basin
 East Winnipeg

Within each area are groups — made up of one or more sections (Beavers, Cubs, Scouts, Venturers, Rovers) a group will have at least a Group Commissioner and may also have a group administrator, secretary, treasurer, registrar and quartermaster. This structure follows the Scouts Canada Standard.

Council Service Center: Winnipeg

Association des Scouts du Canada

French-speaking Scouts are directed by the Comptoir Scout Franco-Manitobains in Winnipeg.

Girl Guides of Canada

Guide Companies were first registered in Manitoba in 1910, in Winnipeg.

Girl Guides of Manitoba

Girl Guides of Manitoba is divided into nine area, six covering rural Manitoba
Cambrian in northern Manitoba
Intermountain in western mid-Manitoba
Interlake in central and eastern mid-Manitoba
Pine Ridge in southeastern Manitoba
Assiniboine in southwestern Manitoba
Pembina Valley in southern Manitoba
and three within Winnipeg
Prairie West
Bishop Grandin
Lagimodiere

Headquarters: Winnipeg
Website: http://www.girlguides.mb.ca/

Camps:
Caddy Lake established in 1948

Former Camps:
Ponemah on Lake Winnipeg established in 1928.

B-PSA Federation of Canada
Canada has several associations which trace their roots to the Baden-Powell Scouts' Association in the United Kingdom. They form the Canadian Federation of Independent Scouting, which is a member of the World Federation of Independent Scouts. Members of the federation include BPSA — Manitoba.

Scout memorials
Scouting memorials include The Seton Centre in Carberry, Manitoba, for Ernest Thompson Seton; an historic plaque and Seton Woodland Park, on the Trans-Canada Highway (east of Carberry, Manitoba); as well as Seton Bridge, Spruce Woods Provincial Park, Manitoba.

See also

Scouting in Minnesota
Scouting in North Dakota

External links
Manitoba Council
Guiding in Canada - Manitoba Council

Scouting and Guiding in Canada